Bagh Golan may refer to:
 Bagh Golan, Minab
 Bagh Golan, Rudan